Cillenus was formerly a genus of beetles in the family Carabidae, but has been transferred to the genus Bembidion as a subgenus. Its species are now members of that genus.

References

 
Trechinae
Obsolete arthropod taxa